Broken Horses is a 2015 mystery thriller film directed by Vidhu Vinod Chopra and starring Anton Yelchin, Chris Marquette, Vincent D'Onofrio, María Valverde, Thomas Jane, and Sean Patrick Flanery. It was released on April 10, 2015. The film is a remake of the 1989 Hindi film Parinda, also directed by Chopra.

Plot
Firmly in the tradition of American Westerns, it follows the lives of the two orphaned brothers. The older one, Buddy, sees his father being shot. Vulnerable and described as "slow", Buddy gets co-opted by gangster Julius Hench and turns into his key assassin. While Buddy grows up in a lawless environment, younger brother Jakey is a violinist auditioning for the New York Philharmonic and on the verge of marrying his Italian girlfriend. But first Jakey must return to his dusty home town near the U.S.–Mexican border to receive his wedding present from his older brother. Returning to that one-horse town opens up unhealed wounds and forces Jakey and Buddy to confront some ugly truths.

Hench will not let Buddy quit the job. He will do anything to keep his most efficient, easily manipulated killing machine on his rolls, including bumping off Jakey. When Jakey realizes what Buddy is up against, he orchestrates a rather poorly designed plan to help them both escape from Hench.

Cast

Production
Principal photography began on October 29, 2012, in and around Los Angeles.

The teaser trailer for the film was released on December 19, 2014. Reliance Entertainment is presenting the film together with Vinod Chopra Films.

Reception
The film received mostly negative reception from the critics. Writing for Variety, Ben Kenigsberg gave a mixed review and said, "This overwrought tale of two orphaned brothers and their violent hometown reunion fails to convince on several crucial levels, including plotting and dialogue. Despite name cast members and ace work from a Clint Eastwood regular [director of photography] Tom Stern, the audience for this curio exists mainly in the Twilight Zone, which is where the movie often seems to be set."

References

External links
 
 
 

2015 films
2015 crime thriller films
2010s mystery thriller films
American crime thriller films
American mystery thriller films
2010s English-language films
English-language Indian films
Films about drugs
Films directed by Vidhu Vinod Chopra
Films shot in California
Films shot in Los Angeles
Mandeville Films films
Sony Pictures Classics films
Films scored by John Debney
Reliance Entertainment films
American remakes of Indian films
2010s American films